is a Japanese sprint canoer who competed in the mid to late 1980s. Competing in two Summer Olympics, he earned his best finish of sixth in the C-1 500 m event at Los Angeles in 1984.

External links
Sports-Reference.com profile

1957 births
Canoeists at the 1984 Summer Olympics
Canoeists at the 1988 Summer Olympics
Japanese male canoeists
Living people
Olympic canoeists of Japan
Asian Games medalists in canoeing
Canoeists at the 1990 Asian Games
Medalists at the 1990 Asian Games
Asian Games silver medalists for Japan